Napapa Tantrakul (born 16 July 1986), also known by the nickname Patt and previously by the given name Suleeporn, is a Thai actress who is active in the entertainment industry since she was 11–12 years. Tantrakul is married to Akarakit “Benz Racing” Worarojcharoendet.

Tantrakul was born on 16 July 1986 to a Thai family of partial Pakistani and Hainanese descent. Tantrakul was raised Islam. In 2016, Tantrakul converted to Buddhism.

Filmography

Television dramas
 2006 Kaw Morn Bai Nun Tee Tur Fun Yam Nun (ขอหมอนใบนั้นที่เธอฝันยามหนุน) (เอ็กแซ็กท์-ซีเนริโอ/Ch.9) as Nid (นิจ (รับเชิญ)) 
 2005 Likisat Hua Jai (ลิขสิทธิ์หัวใจ) (Quiz&Quest/Ch.3) as Mai (ดร.หทัยเทพ ภักดีชล (ไหม)) with Thrisadee Sahawong
 2005 Barb Rak Talay Fun (บาปรักทะเลฝัน) (Quiz&Quest/Ch.3) as Umaporn/Oom (อุมากร (อุ๋ม)) with Thrisadee Sahawong
 2006 Hima Tai Prajun (หิมะใต้พระจันทร์) (Red Drama/Ch.3) as In (อินทุภา (หนูอิน)) with Rattapoom Toekongsap
 2006 Tay Jai Rak Nak Wang Pan (เทใจรักนักวางแผน) (Five Fingers Productions/Ch.3) as Jib Jeerada (จีรดา (จิ๊บ)) with Gosin Ratchakrome
 2007 Ram Pissaward (แรมพิศวาส) (Polyplus entertainment/Ch.3) as Deun Ram (เดือนแรม) with Pattarapol Silapajarn
 2007 Mae Krua Kon Mai (แม่ครัวคนใหม่) (Step Aonvert/Ch.3) as Lomdao/Fai Dam (ล้อมดาว (ไฝดำ)) with Nattaraht Maurice Legrand
 2007 Mafia Tee Ruk (2007) (มาเฟียที่รัก) (METTA & MAHANIYOM/Ch.3) as Pak Boong (พัชราภา (ผักบุ้ง)) with Shahkrit Yamnam
 2008 King Kaew Kar Fak (กิ่งแก้วกาฝาก) (Maker Group/Ch.3) as King Kanok & Kaew Ked (กิ่งกนก / แก้วเก็จ) with Tridsadee Sahawong and Vorarit Vaijairanai
 2008 Ruk Sorn Kaen (รักซ่อนแค้น) (Polyplus Entertainment/Ch.3) as Namneung (น้ำหนึ่ง) with Pattarapol Silapajarn
 2008 Ruk Ter Yord Ruk (2008) (รักเธอยอดรัก) (Five Fingers Productions/Ch.3) as Umwika (อัมวิกา วัชราวัฒน์) with Tridsadee Sahawong
 2009 Mon Ruk Kao Tom Mud (2009) (มนต์รักข้าวต้มมัด) (Polyplus Entertainment/Ch.3) as Chormuang (ช่อม่วง (มะม่วง)) with Rattapoom Toekongsap
 2009 Jao Por Jum Pen (เจ้าพ่อจำเป็นกับเจ้าหนูนินจา) (TV Thunder/Ch.3) as Orlada (วรดา) with Witaya Wasukraipaisarn
 2009 SanaeHa Ngern Tra (เสน่หาเงินตรา) (Step Aonvert/Ch.3) as Farida (Fang) (ฟาริดา (ข้าวฟ่าง)) with Tridsadee Sahawong
 2009 Theptida Pla Rah (เทพธิดาปลาร้า) (Suk San Hun Sa 52/Ch.3) as Bai Mon/Mai Tong (ใบหม่อน / ไหมทอง) with Pasut Banyam
 2010 3 Hua Jai (สามหัวใจ) (Akarapon Productions/Ch.3) as Chom (โฉม) with Pakorn Chatborirak
 2010 Pleng Ruk Rim Khob Fah (เพลงรักริมขอบฟ้า) (Master One VDO Production/Ch.3) as Neera or Namtan (นีรา (น้ำตาล)) with Thagoon Karnthip
 2011 Sapai Mai Rai Sakdena (สะใภ้ไม่ไร้ศักดินา) (TV Scene & Picture/Ch.3) as Panaree kitjaluk (Namkaeng) (ปณาลี กิจจาลักษณ์ (น้ำแข็ง)) with Alexander Rendell
 2011 Theptida Pla Rah 2 (เทพธิดาปลาร้าไห 2) (Suk San Hun Sa 52/Ch.3) as Bai Mon/Mai Tong (ใบหม่อน / ไหมทอง) with Pasut Banyam
 2011 Mae Pua Tabun Fai Mae Yai Talai Plerng (แม่ผัวตะบันไฟ แม่ยายตะไลเพลิง) (TV Thunder/Ch.3) as Mei Lin (เหมยหลิน) with Witaya Wasukraipaisarn
 2012 Rak Prakasit (2012) (รักประกาศิต) (Maker Y/Ch.3) as Supattana (Khun Lek) (สุพัฒนา (คุณเล็ก)) with Sorawit Suboon 
 2012 Baan Nok Kao Krung (บ้านนอกเข้ากรุง) (Quiz&Quest/Ch.3) as Dao-Nil Susak (Ratree) (ดาวนิล สุศักดิ์ (ราตรี)) with Ekkaphong Jongkesakorn
 2013 Ai Koon Pee (ไอ้คุณผี) (Maker K/Ch.3) as Jeerin (จีริน) with Nattaraht Maurice Legrand
 2014 Koo Plub Salub Rang (คู่ปรับสลับร่าง) (Maker K/Ch.3) as Thiamfah (Sud-Kid) (เทียมฟ้า (สุดขีด)) with Sattaphong Phiangphor
 2014 The Rising Sun: Roy Ruk Hak Liam Tawan (The Rising Sun: รอยรักหักเหลี่ยมตะวัน) (Maker K/Ch.3) as Mizawa Aiko (Takeshi's fiancé) (มิซาว่า ไอโกะ) with Suriyont Arunwattanakul
 2014 Rodfai Ruemay Likay Kongtai (รถไฟ เรือเมล์ ลิเก กองถ่าย) (Akarapon Productions/Ch.3) as Pimphatchara Poonpattanasuk (พิมพ์พัชร พูนพัฒนสุข (พิม)) with Kiatkamol Lata
 2018 Mor Pee Cyber 2015 (หมอผีไซเบอร์) (Good Feeling/Ch.3) as Prai Saitarn/Chonticha (Twin Character) (พรายสายธาร (ชลลดา) / ชลธิชา) with Sorawit Suboon
 2018 Song Huajai Nee Puea Tur (สองหัวใจนี้เพื่อเธอ) (Sonix Boom 2013/Ch.3) as Champagne (แชมเปญ / คุณเกศ) 
 2018 Kaew Kumpun (แก้วกุมภัณฑ์) (D-One TV/Ch.3) as Yaowamarn / Yaem (เยาวมาลย์ (แยมหรือแม่แย้ม)) with Thakrit Hamannopjit 
 2019 Buang Nareumit (บ่วงนฤมิต) (Who & Who/Ch.3) as (อรนภา / พิมพ์แข / กนกแข) with Pasut Banyam
 2019 Thong Eak Mor Ya Tah Chaloang (ทองเอก หมอยา ท่าโฉลง) (Sonix Boom 2013/Ch.3) as Chongko (ชงโค) with Freudonidas Natthapong Chartpong
 2019 Game Rak Ao Keun (เกมรักเอาคืน) (/GMM 25) as Gaysiri (เกศิริน) 
 2021 Duang Tah Tee Sarm (ดวงตาที่สาม) (Citizen Kane/Ch.3) as Bhanchoun / Hideko (บานชื่น (บาน) / ฮิเดโกะ) with Witaya Wasukraipaisarn
 2022 Suptar 2550 (ซุปตาร์ 2550) (Citizen Kane/Ch.3) as Pim (พิมพ์ (รับเชิญ)) 
 2023 Mor Luang (Royal Doctor) (หมอหลวง) (Sonix Boom 2013/Ch.3) as Chongko (ชงโค) with Freudonidas Natthapong Chartpong
 2023  (ครูเพ็ญศรีกับเลดี้ปอบ) (B Movie/Workpoint TV) as Lady Pob (เลดี้ปอบ) 
 20 Sai Lap Sabud Chor (สายลับสะบัดช่อ) (/Ch.3) as Parina (ปริณา) with Kiatkamol Lata

Television series
 2019 Club Friday The Series: Season 11 (Club Friday the Series 11 รักไม่ได้ออกอากาศ ตอน รักนอกกฎ) (/GMM 25) as Sin (ซิน) with Witaya Wasukraipaisarn

Television sitcoms

Films

Master of Ceremony: MC 
Television
 2012 : รายการ ตะลุยกองถ่าย On Air Ch.3 (2012-2013)
 2015 : รายการ พราวเสน่ห์ ภายหลังเปลี่ยนชื่อเป็น พราวสตอรี่ On Air Ch.8
 2015 : รายการ E-Entertainment (อีเอนเตอร์เทนเมนท์) On Air Ch.8
 2015 : รายการ เสียงสวรรค์ พิชิตฝัน ภายหลังเปลี่ยนชื่อเป็น เสียงสวรรค์ ขวัญใจมหาชน On Air Ch.3
 2015 : รายการ We Beauty On Air Shop77 
 2015 : รายการ บ้านข่าวบันเทิง On Air 3SD (28) (2015-2016)
 2015 : รายการ At Ten Day (ผลิตรายการโดย 2020 ENTERTAINMENT) เสาร์ 15.00-16.00 น. On Air Ch.3 (เริ่มวันที่ 1 สิงหาคม 2558-ปัจจุบัน ร่วมกับ Wittawat Sunthonwinet
 2015 : Variety@home On Air Amarin TV 
 2016 : รายการ เสียงสวรรค์พิชิตล้าน On Air Ch.8
 2018 : (ผู้หญิงถึงผู้หญิง) On Air Ch.3 (2017-2019)
 2018 : Shair Khao Sao Satrong (แชร์ข่าวสาวสตรอง) (Polyplus Entertainment) Every morning Monday - Friday from 10:00 a.m. to 11:00 a.m. with Pimonwan Hoonthongkam, Puttachat Pongsuchat, Taksaorn Paksukcharern (starting May 7, 2018-present)
 2019 : (ผู้หญิงยกกำลังแจ๋ว) ทุกวันจันทร์ถึงวันศุกร์ เวลา 08.00-08.20 น. On Air Ch.3 ร่วมกับ ปุณยวีร์ สุขกุลวรเศรษฐ์, อภิสรา นุตยกุล, สุภาพร วงษ์ถ้วยทอง (เริ่มวันที่ 1 ตุลาคม 2562-ปัจจุบัน)
 2018 : Snatch Million (เกมกระชากล้าน ซีซั่นที่ 2) On Air Amarin TV with Willy McIntosh
 2019 : Tok Man Ban Teing (ตกมันส์บันเทิงสุดสัปดาห์) On Air Ch.9 (2019-2021)
 2019 : Let Me In Season 4 Reborn On Air Workpoint TV with Warattaya Nilkuha, JakJaan Akhamsiri (2019)
 2019 : Mission Idol ภารกิจลับซุปตาร์ On Air One 31 with Atthama Chiwanitchaphan, Chompoo Konbai (2019)
 2019 : Souy Roy Saeb (สวย รวย แซ่บ) Every Monday - Friday from 6:00 p.m. - 7:00 p.m. On Air GMM 25 with Sakaojai Poonsawatd, Ubonwan Boonrod, Sujira Arunpipat, Tanyares Ramnarong (2019-2020) 
 2019 : Yud Jak Nak Rong (ยุทธจักรนักร้อง) On Air One 31 (2019)
 2021 : Mae Wha Dai (แม่ว่าได้) (Yuenton Studio) On Air Thairath TV with Warinda Damrongphol, Panita Tumwattana (starting March 2, 2021-May 31, 2021)
 2021 : รายการ เผ็ดมันส์บันเทิง (ผลิตรายการโดย) ทุกวันจันทร์ถึงวันศุกร์ เวลา 11.10 น. On Air Ch.8 (เริ่มวันที่ 23 พฤษภาคม 2564-ปัจจุบัน) ร่วมกับ Anna TV-Pool, Primrata Dejudom, อรรณพ ทองบริสุทธิ์ (เริ่มวันจันทร์ที่ 8 มีนาคม พ.ศ. 2564-ปัจจุบัน)
 2022 : Ting Khao Sud Sub Da (ติ่งข่าวสุดสัปดาห์) (Workpoint Entertainment) Every Sunday from 9:00 a.m. to 9:30 a.m. On Air Workpoint TV (starting August 14, 2022-present)

 Online 
 20 : รายการ ปลอมป่ะล่ะ On Air Online
 20 : รายการ The bike idol On Air Online Workpoint TV
 20 : รายการ แม่ว่าแม่รู้ On Air Online GMM 25
 2019 : รายการ PatNapapa On Air Youtube:PatNapapa (14 มีนาคม 2562)

Music video appearance
 20  - (/YouTube:)

References

Living people
1986 births
Napapa Tantrakul
Napapa Tantrakul
Napapa Tantrakul
Converts to Buddhism from Islam
Napapa Tantrakul
Napapa Tantrakul
Napapa Tantrakul
Napapa Tantrakul
Napapa Tantrakul
Napapa Tantrakul
Thai television personalities
Napapa Tantrakul